Draba aizoides is a species of flowering plant in the family Brassicaceae, known as yellow whitlow-grass. It is native to Europe where it is found on limestone rocks and walls. In the British Isles it is found only on the Gower Peninsula in Wales.

Description
Draba aizoides is a perennial plant, with a basal rosette of linear, stiff, entire leaves fringed with white bristles. These have four broad, hardly-notched petals and four hairless sepals. The seed pods are elliptical. The plant flowers in March and April in the British Isles.

Distribution and habitat
Draba aizoides has a wide distribution in the mountains of southern and central Europe, from the Pyrenees in the west, through the Alps to the Carpathians. It also has a number of isolated occurrences, including the Vosges, Jura, Cévennes, Auvergne, Côte d'Or, Plateau de Langres and the Belgian Ardennes. In the British Isles, it is found only on limestone cliffs on the Gower Peninsula, from Worm's Head to Pwlldu Head. It is a lowland species and grows in pockets of soil in damp cracks and crevices in limestone rocks. When it occurs in grassland or in bare soil away from limestone rocks it seldom thrives.

Status in Britain
This plant was first discovered in 1795 in the British Isles, and genetic analysis has shown that the populations in the Gower are quite distinct from those growing in continental Europe, so the plant does seem to be native to Britain. Although its total population is very small, its overall distribution has largely remained stable; plant collectors have removed some plants but the less accessible ones are persisting, although in some sites they have decreased somewhat for reasons that are not clear.

References

External links

aizoides
Flora of Europe
Gower Peninsula
Plants described in 1767